Vriesea duidae is a plant species in the genus Vriesea. This species is native to Venezuela and Guyana.

References

duidae
Flora of Venezuela
Flora of Guyana
Epiphytes
Plants described in 1931